Kampong Batang Perhentian is a village in the south-west of Brunei-Muara District, Brunei. The population was 348 in 2016. It is one of the villages within Mukim Pengkalan Batu. The postcode is BH1523.

References 

Batang Perhentian